Robert Buchar is an American cinematographer, filmmaker, film director and producer, born in 1951 in Hradec Králové, former Czechoslovakia.

In 1966, he came to Prague to study photography at the Secondary School of Graphic Arts, and cinematography at FAMU, the Film Academy of Fine Arts, where he graduated as M.F.A. in 1975. He worked as a cinematographer mainly for the documentary section of Krátký film, before defecting to the United States in 1980. There he worked as a cameraman for CBS until 1989, photographed over twenty films and documentaries in the U.S. and Europe. He also works as director of photography on independent films and commercials.

Since 1989, he teaches cinematography at the Columbia College in Chicago, where he became head of the Cinematography Concentration, the faculty's cinematography program, an advanced production course he developed.

Documentary features

Velvet Hangover
His, and David Smith's, feature-length documentary film Velvet Hangover about the Czech New Wave and the Czech film industry before and after the Velvet Revolution was screened in film festivals around the world. Some of the critics' appraisals:

Featuring in Velvet Hangover (in alphabetic order):

The Collapse of Communism – The Untold Story
Currently (November 2009) Buchar's another documentary The Collapse of Communism – The Untold Story is in postproduction. According to some critics, it showcases the KGB's orchestration and management of the breakup of the Soviet Union. According to some critics, it promotes a conspiracy theory that the fall of communism in Eastern Europe was a hoax. Buchar's own view (supporting his critics):

Featuring in The Collapse of Communism (in alphabetic order):

Filmography
documentaries, feature-length, also as director / producer
 Velvet Hangover, together with David Smith, 1999/2000, USA(in Czech: Sametová kocovina, 2002)
 The Collapse of Communism – The Untold Story, 2009/2010, USA
other, (mainly / also) as director of photography
 Four Seasons (in Czech: Čtvero ročních dob), 2008
 Bear Not to Be, 1968
 Certainly, 1969
 The Club, 1971
 In the Sign of Eagle, 1978
 The Comets, 1979
 City in the Center of the City, 1979
 Ethology of Animals, 1980
 Basic Meditation Exercise, directed by George Drasnar (Jiří Drašnar) (in Czech), 1981
 Go West-Sing West, 1991
 Where are you, 1992
 The Land of Youth, 1992
 Granny, 1998
 Poslední z rodu, directed by Drahomíra Vihanová, Czechoslovakia, 1977

Books
 Czech New Wave Filmmakers in Interviews, foreword by Antonin J. Liehm, McFarland & Company, 2003 (based upon the Velvet Hangover documentary)
 And Reality be Damned ...  December 2009, Eloquent Strategic Publishing  (based upon The Collapse of Communism – The Untold Story documentary)in Czech: Revoluce 1989 – utajené informace ze zákulisí, Brána, 2009
professional
 Design of the photographic and the cinematographic image, with Jan Smok, Academy of Performing Arts in Prague, Prague 2001
 The Spotmeter and its application in cinematography and video (on proper metering techniques)

References

External links
 BucharFilm – author's website
 Robert Buchar – entry at IMDb web

American film directors
American conspiracy theorists
Living people
Year of birth missing (living people)